The Waray Wikipedia is the Waray language edition of Wikipedia. It is hosted on servers run by the Wikimedia Foundation since 25 September 2005. Despite having very few active users, the Waray Wikipedia has a high number of automatically generated articles created by bots, most of them by Swedish Wikipedian Sverker Johansson's Lsjbot.

Waray (or Waray-Waray) is spoken by approximately 3.6 million people in the Eastern Visayas region of the Philippines.

History
The Waray Wikipedia was first organized in Tacloban on 25 September 2005 by Harvey Fiji. The wiki had a small number of contributors, with fewer than ten editors per month until April 2009. The first meet-up of editors took place in January 2013 in Tacloban.

By early 2011 the Waray Wikipedia had attracted notice for including more than twice as many articles as the Tagalog Wikipedia, which is based on the principal language of the Philippines. This discrepancy was explained by the very large number of articles added automatically by bots, with no direct human input. By early June 2014 the Waray Wikipedia had attained a very high article count of 1 million, but a very low article depth of less than 3. Article depth is an attempt to measure the collaborative quality of articles, based on the number of edits per article.

(Waray and Tagalog are related languages belonging to the Malayo-Polynesian branch of the Austronesian language family.)

However, Waray Wikipedia does not appear to be widely used in the Philippines; as of March 2021, 90% of Wikipedia views from that country were directed at English Wikipedia, with 5% going to Tagalog and 3%, to Russian Wikipedia. About 35% of Waray Wikipedia views come from China, 25% from the United States, about 15% from Germany and France, and less than 8% from the Philippines.

Milestones
 On 26 August 2010, the Waray Wikipedia passed the 100,000-article milestone, making it the 35th largest language edition at that time.
 On 8 June 2014, the encyclopedia passed the 1 million article mark, which was mostly made by Lsjbot. It was the very first Wikipedia for a language in the Philippines and Asia that reached 1 million articles.

References

Further reading
  - Originally written in English, it includes a Mandarin Chinese translation (titled "族語傳遞資訊──瓦萊語維基百科經驗談") by Chen Yingrou (陳穎柔).

External links

Meetup page of Waray Wikipedia
Milestones of the Waray Wikipedia
Waray Wikipedia mobile version
 Improving Wikimedia Projects Content through Collaboration - Waray Wikipedia Experience, 2014-2017

Philippine encyclopedias
Wikipedias by language
Wiki
Internet properties established in 2005
2005 establishments in the Philippines